William Lyon (March 9, 1923 – May 22, 2020) was a major general of the United States Air Force who served as Commander of the United States Air Force Reserve Command, Headquarters U.S. Air Force, Washington D.C., and commander, Headquarters Air Force Reserve, a separate operating agency located at Robins Air Force Base, Georgia. As chief of Air Force Reserve, Lyon served as the principal adviser on Reserve matters to the Air Force Chief of Staff. As commander of AFRES, he had full responsibility for the supervision of U.S. Air Force Reserve units around the world.

Biography
Lyon was born in Los Angeles, California in 1923. Prior to entering the U.S. Army Air Corps in 1943, he attended the University of Southern California and the Dallas Aviation School and Air College. He completed Air War College in 1971 and the Air War College; Air National Guard and Air Force Reserve Senior Officers Orientation Course in 1972 and 1974. Additionally, he attended the Industrial College of the Armed Forces National Seminar in 1973.

Lyon enlisted in the U.S. Army Air Corps as a reservist in 1943 and continued serving as a civilian flight instructor until he received a direct appointment as a flight officer in June 1944. During World War II, he was assigned to the 6th Ferrying Group and ferried aircraft to the Pacific and European theaters. In 1945 he was assigned to the North African Division of the Air Transport Command, returning to the United States in 1946. In 1947 he was commissioned as a second lieutenant and participated in various Reserve assignments until his voluntary recall to active duty in 1951. He was then assigned to Headquarters Air Training Command as a staff pilot and was later transferred to the Military Air Transport Service, flying air evacuation and ferrying missions. In 1953 he volunteered for a tour of duty in Korea and flew 75 combat missions in the C-46 and C-47.

From 1954 to 1963, Lyon was assigned to various positions in the Reserve and served as a flight commander and operations officer. In 1963 he was named commander of the 929th Tactical Airlift Squadron, March Air Force Base, California, and subsequently served as commander of the parent unit, the 943d Tactical Airlift Group. Lyon was assigned as mobilization assistant to the commander, Sacramento Air Materiel Area, McClellan Air Force Base, California, in June 1970 and, in February 1972, he became mobilization assistant to the commander, Fifteenth Air Force at March Air Force Base. In March 1974 he was appointed mobilization assistant to the commander in chief, Strategic Air Command, Offutt Air Force Base, Nebraska, where he was involved in the planning of the transfer of designated KC-135 units to the Reserve Forces. In April 1975 Lyon was ordered to active duty to serve as chief of Air Force Reserve, Headquarters U.S. Air Force, Washington, D.C.

Lyon was a command pilot. His military decorations and awards included the Legion of Merit, Distinguished Flying Cross, Air Medal with two oak leaf clusters, Presidential Unit Citation, Air Force Outstanding Unit Award, Combat Readiness Medal, Armed Forces Reserve Medal with hour glass device, and the Republic of Korea Presidential Unit Citation. He was promoted to the grade of major general on April 24, 1974, with date of rank May 24, 1972. He retired on April 16, 1979.

Other work
 
Lyon established the William Lyon Homes Inc. real estate company in 1954, based in Newport Beach. He  was a founding chairman of the Commercial Bank of California. Since 2016, his son William H. Lyon has been the chairman of the real estate business, as well as involved with the William Lyon Financial subsidiary and on the board of directors for the California bank.

Lyon founded the Lyon Air Museum near the John Wayne Airport in Orange County, California.

References

1923 births
2020 deaths
People from Los Angeles
People from Coto de Caza, California
United States Air Force generals
Military personnel from California
University of Southern California alumni
Air War College alumni
United States Army personnel of World War II
American military personnel of the Korean War
Recipients of the Legion of Merit
Recipients of the Distinguished Flying Cross (United States)
Recipients of the Air Medal
Recipients of the Order of the Sword (United States)